The Corsários Rugby Clube is a Brazilian rugby union club based in Rio Grande, Rio Grande do Sul, founded in 2009.

References

External links
 Artigo no Jornal Agora sobre os Corsários 
 Campeonato promovido pelo clube na praia do Cassino 

Brazilian rugby union teams